From the 16th to the 17th centuries, the First French colonial empire stretched from a total area at its peak in 1680 to over , the second largest empire in the world at the time behind only the Spanish Empire. In terms of population however, on the eve of World War II, France and her colonial possessions totaled only 150 million inhabitants, compared with 330 million for British India alone. The total area of ​​the French colonial empire, with the first (mainly in the Americas and Asia) and second (mainly in Africa and Asia), the French colonial empires combined, reached , the second largest in the world (the first being the British Empire). 

France began to establish colonies in North America, the Caribbean and India, following Spanish and Portuguese successes during the Age of Discovery, in rivalry with Britain. A series of wars with Britain during the 18th century and early 19th century, which France finally lost, almost ended its colonial ambitions in these regions, and without it what some historians term the "first" French colonial empire. In the 19th century, starting with the conquest of Algiers in 1830, France began to establish a new empire in Africa and Southeast Asia.

The following is a list of all countries that were part of the French colonial empires in the last 500 years, either entirely or in part, either under French sovereignty or as mandate.

In the Americas

 Present-day Canada
 New France (1534–1763), and nearby lands:
 Acadia (1604–1713)
 Newfoundland
 Hudson Bay
 Saint Lawrence River
 Great Lakes
 Lake Winnipeg
 Quebec
 Present-day United States
 The Fort Saint Louis (Texas) (1685–1689)
 Saint Croix, U.S. Virgin Islands (1650–1733)
 Fort Caroline in French Florida (occupation by Huguenots) (1562–1565)
 Vincennes and Fort Ouiatenon in Indiana
 French Louisiana (23.3% of the current U.S. territory) (1801–1804) (sold by Napoleon I) (also see: Louisiana (New Spain))
 Lower Louisiana
 Upper Louisiana
 Louisiana (New France) (1672–1764)
 Present-day Mexico
 French invasion of 1861–1867 (1838-1839, 1861-1867)
 Present-day Brazil
 France Équinoxiale (Bay of São Luis) (1610–1615)
 The island of Saint Alexis (1531)
 The Territory of Amapá (1897) (disputed Franco-Brazilian territory resolved in favour of Brazil)
 The city of Viçosa-Ceará (Territory of Ibiapaba) (1590–1604)
 France Antarctique, to Fort Coligny (Rio de Janeiro Bay; intended as a haven for Huguenots) (1555–1567)
 Île Delphine's island (1736–1737)
 Present-day Argentina
 French blockade of the Río de la Plata and the Anglo-French blockade of the Río de la Plata, Kingdom of Araucanía and Patagonia (1838–1840, 1845-1850, 1860-1862)
 Present-day Chile
 Kingdom of Araucanía and Patagonia (1860-1862)
 Present-day Haiti
 St. Domingue (1627–1804)
 Present-day Dominican Republic (1795–1809)
 Present-day Suriname
 Tapanahony (District of Sipaliwini) (Controversial Franco-Dutch in favour of the Netherlands) (25.8% of the current territory) (1814)
 Present-day Guyana (1782–1784)
 Present-day Saint Kitts and Nevis
 Saint Christopher Island (1628–1690, 1698–1702, 1706, 1782–1783)
 Nevis (1782–1784)
 Present-day Antigua and Barbuda
 Antigua (briefly in 1666)
 Present-day Trinidad and Tobago
 Tobago (1666–1667, 1781–1793, 1802–1803)
 Dominica (1625–1763, 1778–1783)
 Grenada (1650–1762, 1779–1783)
 Saint Vincent and the Grenadines (1719–1763, 1779–1783)
 Saint Lucia (1650–1723, 1756–1778, 1784–1803)
 Turks and Caicos Islands (1783)
 Montserrat (1666, 1712)
 Falkland Islands (1504, 1701, 1764–1767)
 Îles des Saintes (1648–present)
 Marie-Galante (1635–present)
 la Désirade (1635–present)
 Guadeloupe (1635–present)
 Martinique (1635–present)
 French Guiana (1604–present)
 Saint Pierre and Miquelon (1604–1713, 1763–present)
 Collectivity of Saint Martin (1624–present)
 Saint Barthélemy (1648–1784, 1878–present)
 Clipperton Island (1858–present)

In Africa

French North Africa

 Egypt (1798-1801)
 French Algeria (1830–1962)
 Protectorate of Tunisia (1881–1956)
 Protectorate in Morocco (1912–1956) 
 Military Territory of Fezzan-Ghadames (1943–1951)

French West Africa

 Ivory Coast (1843–1960)
 Dahomey or French Dahomey (now Benin) (1883–1960)
 Independent of Dahomey, under French protectorate in 1889
 Porto-Novo (protectorate) (1863–1865, 1882)
 Cotonou (protectorate) (1868)
 French Sudan (now Mali) (1883–1960)
 Senegambia and Niger (1902–1904)
 Guinea or French Guinea (1891–1958)
 Mauritania (1902–1960)
Adrar emirate (protectorate) (1909)
 The Tagant confederation's emirate (protectorate) (1905)
 Brakna confederation's emirate (protectorate)
 Emirate of Trarza (protectorate) (1902)
 Niger (1890–1960)
 Sultanate of Damagaram (Zinder) (protectorate) (1899)
 Senegal (1677–1960)
 French Upper Volta (now Burkina Faso) (1896–1960)
 French Togoland (1918–1960) (formerly a German colony, mandate became a French colony) (now Togo)
 Nigeria
 The Enclaves of Forcados and Badjibo (territory under a lease of 30 years) (1900–1927)
 The Emirate of Muri (Northeast of Nigeria) (1892–1893)
 Gambia
 Albreda (1681–1857)
 Kunta Kinteh Island (1695–1697, 1702)

French Equatorial Africa

 Chad (1900–1960)
 Oubangui-Chari (currently Central African Republic) (1905–1960)
 Dar al Kuti (protectorate) (1897) (in 1912 its sultanate was suppressed by the French)
 Sultanate of Bangassou (protectorate) (1894)
 Present-day The Republic of Congo, then French Congo (1875–1960)
 Gabon (1839–1960)
 French Cameroon (91% of current Cameroon) (1918–1960) (formerly a German colony, Mandate, Protectorate then French Colony)
 São Tomé and Príncipe (1709)

East Africa and Indian Ocean

 Madagascar (1896–1960)
 Kingdom of Imerina (protectorate) (1896)
 Isle de France (1715–1810) (now Mauritius)
 Djibouti (French Somaliland) (the French Territory of the Afars and the Issas) (French Somalia) (1862–1977)
 French Egypt (1798–1801, 1858–1882, 1956)
 Mayotte (1841–present)
 Seychelles (1756–1810)
 Chagos Archipelago (1721–1745, 1768–1814)
 The Scattered Islands (Banc du Geyser, Bassas da India, Europa Island, Juan de Nova Island, Glorioso Islands, Tromelin Island)
 Comoros (1866–1975)
 Réunion (1710–present)

In Asia

 French Indochina
French Indochinese Union (1887–1954)
Laos (protectorate) (1893–1953)
 Cambodia (protectorate) (1863–1953)
Vietnam
Cochinchina (Southern Vietnam) (1858–1949)
 Annam (protectorate) (Central Vietnam) (1883–1949)
 Tonkin (protectorate) (Northern Vietnam) (1884–1949)
 State of Vietnam (1949–1954)
 Spratly Islands (1933–1939)
 Paracel Islands (1933–1939) 
Some territories in the eastern part of Thailand (independent state, but after Franco-Siamese War in 1893, Thailand has lost 3 provinces during the next 15 years)
 Chanthaburi Province (1893-1904)
 Trat Province (1904-1907)
 Dan Sai District (in the area of the Loei Province:1903-1907)
 India and Sri Lanka
 French India
 French Establishments of India, composed of Pondichéry (1765–1954); Karikal (1725–1954); Mahé (1721–1954) Yanaon (1723–1954);  Chandannagar (1673–1952) 
 Taiwan 
 The city/port of Keelung (1884–1885)
 Pescadores Islands (1885)
 Basilan (1845)
 Dutch East Indies (1808–1811)
The Netherlands under Napoleon Bonaparte in 1806, oversaw the Batavian Republic become the Commonwealth of Batavia and then dissolved and replaced by the Kingdom of Holland, a French puppet kingdom ruled by Napoleon's third brother Louis Bonaparte (Lodewijk Napoleon). As a result, the East Indies during this time were treated as a proxy French colony, administrated through Dutch intermediary.
 China
 The territory of Kouang-Tchéou-Wan, a dependency of French Indochina) (1898–1945)
 The foreign concessions : French Concession of Shanghai (1849–1946), Tianjin (1860–1946) and Hankou (1898–1946)
 The Spheres of French influence officially recognized by China on the provinces of Yunnan, Guangxi, Hainan, Guangdong
 Shamian Island (1859–1949) (a fifth of the island)
 Palestine
 Syria or French Syria (1920–1946) (French Mandate of Syria)
 Alawite State (1920–1936)
 State of Aleppo (1920–1924)
 State of Jabal Druze (1921–1936)
 State of Damascus (1920–1924)
 Sanjak of Alexandretta (now part of Turkey)
 State of Greater Lebanon (now it is Lebanon) (1920–1946)
 Lebanon or French Lebanon (1920–1946) (French Mandate of Lebanon)
 Mount Lebanon (An international protocol fixes the autonomy of the mount Lebanon under the protection of France)
 Yemen
 Cheikh Saïd (Some French atlases and history books claimed the territory was French, but France never occupied it and never claimed jurisdiction or sovereignty over the territory, which therefore was never French, remaining under Turkish, then Yemeni control.)

In Oceania

 French Polynesia
 Society Islands (became a French protectorate in 1843 and a colony in 1880)
 Otaheiti, known as Tahiti (protectorate) (1842–1880)
 Raiatea and Tahaa (protectorate) (1880)
 Tuamotu Archipelago
 Marquesas Islands (under French control in 1870, and later incorporated into the territory of French Polynesia)
 Gambier Islands
 Mangareva (protectorate) (1844/1871)
 Austral Islands
 Rurutu (Austral Islands) (protectorate) (1858–1889)
 Papua New Guinea
 New Ireland (1880–1882) (attempt at colonization, unofficial)
 New Caledonia 
 Chesterfield Islands
 Matthew and Hunter Islands
 Loyalty Islands
 Île des Pins
Hawaiian Islands (1837) (at the beginning of French presence there; however, the United States persuaded the local Queen to negotiate with them instead, by means of the strength of a company of U.S. Marines)
Hawaii (1849) (French invasion of Honolulu)
 The New Hebrides (Vanuatu)
 French protectorate (1887–1906)
 Anglo-French condominium (1906–1980)
 Australia
 Dirk Hartog Island (1772) (made an unofficial annexation for all Australia)
 Wallis and Futuna (1887–present)
 Kingdom of Uvea (Wallis and Futuna) (declared to be a protectorate by King of Uvea and Captain Mallet in 1842. Officially in a treaty becomes a French protectorate in 1887 until annexed in 1917)
 Kingdom of Sigave (signed a treaty establishing a French protectorate in 1888 until annexed in 1917)
 Kingdom of Alo (Wallis and Futuna) (signed a treaty establishing a French protectorate in 1888 until annexed in 1917)

In Antarctica

 French Southern and Antarctic Lands (TAAF)
 Crozet Islands (24 January 1772– present)
 Kerguelen Islands (13 February 1772– present)
 Île Amsterdam (in 1843 but abandoned) (1892–present)
 Île Saint-Paul (in 1843 but abandoned) (1892–present)
 Adélie Land (1840–present) (sheltering one of two French Bases in Antarctica, the other one being Franco-Italian (that borders with the Australian Antarctic Territory on both sides and divides that in two)

See also
 CFA franc
 Franco-Trarzan War of 1825
 French Africa
 French colonial flags
 French Colonial Union
 French colonization of the Americas
 Kouang-Tchéou-Wan – a small French territory in China
 Organisation internationale de la Francophonie
 Overseas France
 Timeline of the European colonization of North America
 Troupes coloniales – French colonial forces

Notes and references

External links

•
.
French colonisation in Africa
French colonisation in Asia
French colonization of the Americas
List
French possessions
possessions and colonies
possessions and colonies